The London Souls were an American, New York City based rock and roll band active from 2008 to 2018.

Formation and  The London Souls
Tash Neal and Chris St. Hilaire met in New York City as teenagers, jamming for the first time in hourly rehearsal rooms with friends. They shared a passion for songwriting and improvisation, and in 2008 formed The London Souls.

Their song "She's So Mad" has received airplay on FOX TV's show Fearless Music. Also, their song "I Think I Like It" was used in a commercial advertising NBA star Derrick Rose's line of shoes by Adidas.

Their debut self-titled album was released on July 12, 2011.

On November 16, 2012, The London Souls announced they would release their third album Here Come The Girls on January 8, 2013. The release was delayed due to injuries sustained by Tash Neal during a hit and run accident.  The album was released on April 7, 2015.

Current members
Tash Neal - Guitar/vocals 
Chris St. Hilaire - Drums/vocals

Discography
What You Need - 2009 (Unreleased & Self Produced - 16 Tracks)
The London Souls - 2011
Here Come The Girls - 2015

References

External links
Official homepage

Musical groups from New York City
Musical groups established in 2008